Mana Dembélé (born 29 November 1988) is a Malian professional footballer who plays as a striker for Racing FC Union Luxembourg.

Career
Born in Ivry-sur-Seine, France, Dembélé has played with LB Châteauroux, Chamois Niortais and Clermont. In January 2014 he signed for Guingamp on a three-and-a-half year deal.

He was called up by Mali for the 2013 African Cup of Nations.

See also
 Sub-Saharan African community of Paris

References

External links
 
 

1988 births
Living people
Citizens of Mali through descent
Malian footballers
Mali international footballers
French footballers
French expatriate footballers
French sportspeople of Malian descent
People from Ivry-sur-Seine
Ligue 1 players
Ligue 2 players
Championnat National players
Championnat National 2 players
Championnat National 3 players
Luxembourg National Division players
LB Châteauroux players
Chamois Niortais F.C. players
Clermont Foot players
En Avant Guingamp players
AS Nancy Lorraine players
Le Havre AC players
Racing FC Union Luxembourg players
Association football forwards
Stade Lavallois players
French expatriate sportspeople in Luxembourg
Expatriate footballers in Luxembourg
Black French sportspeople